TMTC may refer to:

TriMet
Traffic Motor Truck Corporation